The Hans Peter Nielson Gristmill, also known as the Bicknell Gristmill, in Wayne County, Utah near Bicknell, Utah, was built around 1890.  It was listed on the National Register of Historic Places in 1975.

It was built for Danish immigrant Hans Peter Nielson, a miller born in Denmark who came to Utah in 1863, and was constructed by Danish-born carpenter Niels Hansen. It was operated by Nielsen until his death in 1909, then operated by three brothers: Ernest, Jesse and Clinton Syrett, until 1921, then operated by others until 1935.

References

Grinding mills on the National Register of Historic Places in Utah
National Register of Historic Places in Wayne County, Utah
Buildings and structures completed in 1890